The Famicom 3D System is a Japan-exclusive accessory for the Nintendo Family Computer released in 1987.

Overview 

The 3D System consists of a pair of active shutter glasses and an adapter to connect them to the Famicom's third player expansion port. The glasses are connected to the adapter via dual 3.5 mm jacks. This allowed compatible games to display a stereoscopic image similar to that of the Sega Master System's SegaScope 3-D Glasses. Games would play in conventional 2D until a "3D mode" was activated by use of the select button.

Twin Famicom 3D System 

Sharp Corporation released their own branded version of the 3D System called the Twin Famicom 3D System. Though marketed towards users of Sharp's Twin Famicom, it was equivalent to the 3D System with only cosmetic differences.

Reception and legacy 
The 3D System was a commercial failure and, as a result, was never released outside Japan. Criticisms included the clunkiness of the glasses and the limited selection of compatible titles. Eight years later, in 1995, Nintendo again ventured into stereoscopic gaming with the commercially unsuccessful Virtual Boy. In the following years, Nintendo experimented in stereoscopic 3D with both the GameCube and Game Boy Advance SP systems, but these features were not released commercially due to cost and technical limitations. In 2011, Nintendo released the 3DS handheld capable of displaying stereoscopic 3D images without the need for special glasses. The 3DS has enjoyed a largely positive reception. In 2019 Nintendo released a Labo VR Kit.

List of compatible games 

Attack Animal Gakuen by Pony Canyon
Cosmic Epsilon by Asmik
Falsion by Konami
Famicom Grand Prix II: 3D Hot Rally by Nintendo
Highway Star (Rad Racer outside Japan) by Square
JJ: Tobidase Daisakusen Part II by Square
Fuuun Shourin Ken - Ankoku no Maou  by Jaleco

See also 
Nintendo 3DS
SegaScope 3-D Glasses
Virtual Boy

References

External links
 from FamicomDojo.TV

Nintendo Entertainment System accessories
Video game console add-ons
Stereoscopy
Japan-only video game hardware